Raj Shekhar is an Indian lyricist. He made his Bollywood debut as a lyricist with the 2011 film Tanu Weds Manu. He went on to write lyrics for other notable films including Tanu Weds Manu Returns, Tumbbad, Veere Di Wedding, Hichki and Uri: The Surgical Strike.

Career
He started his career as an assistant director to Aanand L. Rai. He made his debut as a lyricist in the Bollywood film Tanu Weds Manu, directed by Rai and starring R. Madhavan and Kangana Ranaut. He assisted Abbas Tyrewala in Jaane Tu... Ya Jaane Na and Sujoy Ghosh in Home Delivery.

As lyricist

References

External links
 

Indian lyricists
Living people
Hindi-language lyricists
Year of birth missing (living people)